La Copa Bolivia is an official football competition organized by the Bolivian Football Federation, which is played by the direct elimination system, the winner of which qualifies for a Copa Simón Bolívar.

History
La Copa Bolivia was first held in 1976 and is the oldest association football competition in Bolivia. Because it involves clubs of all standards playing against each other, there is the possibility for "minnows" from the lower divisions to become "giant-killers" by eliminating top clubs from the tournament and even theoretically win the Cup, although lower division teams rarely reach the final. In 2002 it was replaced and transformed into the current Aerosur Cup.
The tournament was created by the Bolivian National Football Association (ANF) so that the second of the associations had one more opportunity to qualify for  National B, where promotion is played to the  League. The initial game mode was aimed at classifying three teams to  National B. It was played by the runner-up teams of the nine departmental associations, the runner-up of the Interprovincial Tournament and 2 teams as guests.
The Bolivia Cup stopped being played as of the 2017 season. The ANF focused its argument on the fact that the clubs participating in the 2016 Bolivia Cup faced organizational problems, the lack of financial resources being the main obstacle.
For the 2022 season of Bolivian soccer, the Bolivian Soccer Federation plans to hold three tournaments in the year, one of them the Bolivia Cup.

Format
The competition is a knockout tournament with pairings for each round drawn at random – there are no seeds, and the draw for each round is not made until after the scheduled dates for the previous round. The draw also determines which teams will play at home.

There are a total of 5 rounds in the competition — six qualifying rounds, followed by two group stages, semi-finals, and the final. The competition begins in January with the extra preliminary round, followed by the preliminary round and first qualifying round, which are contested by the lowest-ranked clubs. Finally, teams from the Liga de Fútbol Profesional Boliviano  enter at the third round, at which point there are 64 teams remaining in the competition. From 1976 to 1996 the final was played in the Estadio Hernando Siles.

Media coverage
The Copa Bolivia Final is one of 10 events reserved for live broadcast on Bolivia terrestrial television under the ITC Code on Sports and Other Listed Events.

In October 1998 La Liga manager announced that ATB, Canal 7 and Unitel Bolivia would show an additional match (For example: the Second Qualifying round, the group stage and also the final).

List of championships

Copa Bolivia

Results by team (Copa Bolivia)

See also
Copa Bolivia (Ascenso)
Aerosur Cup
Liga de Fútbol Profesional Boliviano
Bolivian Football Regional Leagues

References 

 
Bolivia